Francesca Angelucci Capaldi (born June 8, 2004) is an American actress. She is perhaps best known for her role as Chloe James on the Disney Channel original sitcom Dog With A Blog (2012–2015) and as Nellie Chambers in the Brat TV web series Crown Lake.(2019–2020). 

Capaldi has also appeared in The Peanuts Movie (2015), Max 2: White House Hero (2017), and two episodes of How I Met Your Mother in 2012.

Life and career
Capaldi was born in La Jolla, California to Anthony and Gina (Angelucci) Capaldi, both of Italian descent. She resides in Carlsbad, California with her parents. She began acting with small roles in the Disney Channel Original Series A.N.T. Farm and in the CBS comedy How I Met Your Mother, as a 7-year-old Lily, who is played as an adult by Alyson Hannigan. In addition, Capaldi was featured in the pilot for The Goodwin Games. Capaldi also stars in Corbin Bernsen's independent film 3 Day Test and in Dog with a Blog on Disney Channel, her series regular debut. She started her voicing career as the voice of the Little Red-Haired Girl in the 2015 film The Peanuts Movie.

In 2019, Capaldi starred in the web series Crown Lake on Brat TV as Nellie Chambers, a girl who is targeted by an unknown person at a boarding school in 1994. She reprised the role in 2020 in a second season of Crown Lake. In 2022, it was announced that the third season of Crown Lake would be set in present day and that Capaldi would be departing from the show.

Filmography

Film

Television

References

External links

2004 births
Living people
21st-century American actresses
Actresses from San Diego
American child actresses
American film actresses
American people of Italian descent
American television actresses
American web series actresses
People from La Jolla, San Diego